Panneer Pushpangal is a 1981 Indian Tamil-language romance film jointly directed by Santhana Bharathi and P. Vasu in their directorial debut. The film stars Pratap, Vennira Aadai Moorthy and newcomers Suresh Kumar and Shanthi Krishna. It was released on 3 July 1981. It was dubbed into Telugu as Madhura Geetham and released on 20 March 1982.

Plot 
Panneer Pushpangal is a love story between Aravind Prabhu and Uma supported by their teacher Prem.

Cast 
Pratap as Prem
Vennira Aadai Moorthy as the hostel warden
Suresh as Aravind Prabhu
Shanthi Krishna as Uma
Jr. Manohar as Babu
Archana as Uma's mother

Production

Development 
During an impromptu discussion, K. Somasundareswaran had narrated the story of two convent students coming of age to Gangai Amaran. Moved by the tale, Amaran gave the directorial opportunity to P. Vasu and Santhana Bharathi at the helm. Vasu, son of make-up man Peethambaram and Santhana Bharathi, son of producer M. R. Santhanam, made their directorial debuts with this film. According to Amaran, "The idea of the story came out of friendly banter".

Casting 
A photographer friend of Suresh Kumar's father opined that Suresh could make it as a lead actor and with a portfolio, Suresh approached director C. V. Sridhar to feature in his films, but his effort went in vain. He then met Bharathi and Vasu who decided to cast him in Panneer Pushpangal, while simultaneously he was cast in the lead role in Bharathiraja's Alaigal Oivathillai presenting him with a dilemma of which film to choose; he chose the former. The film also marked the Tamil debut of Shanthi Krishna.

Filming 
The film was shot at The Laidlaw Memorial School of St. George's Homes, Ketti, in the Nilgiris.

Themes 
Panneer Pushpangal deals with adolescent love, a theme that was not frequently explored in 1980s Tamil cinema.

Soundtrack 

The soundtrack was composed by Ilaiyaraaja.

Tamil (original) version 

Lyrics were written by Gangai Amaran. The song "Ananda Raagam" is set in Simhendramadhyamam raga, and "Vengaya Sambarum" is set in Shanmukhapriya. Ilaiyaraja later reused "Ananda Ragam" as "Saara Yeh Aalam" in Shiva (2006).

Telugu (dubbed) version 

This film was dubbed into Telugu as Madhura Geetham and all songs were written by Rajasri.

References

Bibliography

External links 
 

1980s Tamil-language films
1981 directorial debut films
1981 films
Films directed by P. Vasu
Films directed by Santhana Bharathi
Indian coming-of-age films
Indian romance films
Films scored by Ilaiyaraaja
1980s coming-of-age films
1980s romance films